Jo Hikk is a Canadian country music group founded in Calgary, Alberta. This four-piece band is composed of brothers Kelly Sitter (lead vocals, bass guitar) and Kenny Sitter (guitar, ganjo, vocals), Al Doell (drums, vocals) and Don Jorgensen (keyboards, mandolin). Their first album, Ride, was re-released in early 2009. Their first single, "Closer", charted in the Top 40. The song was written and originally recorded by Thrasher Shiver in 1996.

Jo Hikk scored two more hit singles with "My Kind Of Radio" and "Sweet City Woman"(cover version of a hit song by The Stampeders].(both hit top #20), while another key track, "Pimp My Tractor," was placed on the Big Rock compilation. With the success of "Ride", Jo Hikk was nominated at the CCMA Awards 'Rising Star' three years in a row and for 'Group or Duo of the Year'.

Jo Hikk's second album, The Game, was released in August 2010. A music video was shot on location in Toronto with Warren P. Sonoda for the first single, "The Big Spoon".

Discography

Albums

Singles

Music videos

Awards and nominations

References
Jo Hikk biography at CMT.ca
Review of Ride at Country Music News

Canadian country music groups